The 1986 NHK Trophy was held at the Yoyogi National Gymnasium in Tokyo. Medals were awarded in the disciplines of men's singles, ladies' singles, pair skating, and ice dancing.

Results

Men

Ladies

Pairs

Ice dancing

External links

 1986 NHK Trophy

Nhk Trophy, 1986
NHK Trophy